AS Police (Brazzaville) is a Congolese football club based in Brazzaville, Republic of the Congo.

The team plays currently plays in Congo Second Division.

In 2002 and 2005 the club has won the Congo Premier League.

Honours
Congo Premier League: 2
 2002, 2005.

Coupe du Congo: 1
 2001.

Super Coupe du Congo: 0

Stadium
Currently the team plays at the 33300 capacity Stade Alphonse Massemba-Débat.

References

External links
Soccerway
Wikipedia.fr

Football clubs in the Republic of the Congo
Sports clubs in Brazzaville
Police association football clubs